Veronika Vadovičová (born February 9, 1983) is a Slovakian Paralympic shooter.  In 2008 Paralympic Games in Beijing, China, she won gold medalint the 10 meter SH1. She competed at the 2016 Summer Paralympics, winning two gold medals and a silver medal. She competed at the 2020 Summer Paralympics, in Mixed R6 50 metre rifle prone SH1, winning a gold medal.

Career 
She won 3 golds at the 2014 IPC Shooting World Cup in Fort Benning, Georgia where she competed against Matt Skelhon. She was a gold medalist at the 2006 World Shooting Championships where she competed in three-position 50-meter rifle event. On October 24, 2014 she won a gold medal at the 2014 IPC Shooting European Championships.

On March 15, 2016 Vadovičová broke the R3 (mixed 10m air rifle prone SH1) qualification world record, on the opening day of competition, at the IPC Shooting World Cup in Bangkok, Thailand.

Vadovičová took the gold medal in the 2017 Para Sport World Cup held in the UAE beating Lorraine Lambert who gained the silver position.

References

External links
 

1983 births
Living people
Slovak female sport shooters
Paralympic shooters of Slovakia
Paralympic gold medalists for Slovakia
Paralympic silver medalists for Slovakia
Paralympic bronze medalists for Slovakia
Paralympic medalists in shooting
Shooters at the 2008 Summer Paralympics
Shooters at the 2012 Summer Paralympics
Shooters at the 2016 Summer Paralympics
Medalists at the 2008 Summer Paralympics
Medalists at the 2012 Summer Paralympics
Medalists at the 2016 Summer Paralympics
Sportspeople from Trnava
Shooters at the 2020 Summer Paralympics
Palacký University Olomouc alumni
Comenius University alumni